James Morrison Harris (November 20, 1817 – July 16, 1898) was a Representative from the third district of Maryland.

Born in Baltimore, Maryland, Harris was educated at private institutions in the city. He then entered Lafayette College in Easton, Pennsylvania in 1833 where he studied law. Harris was admitted to the bar in 1843 and commenced practice in Baltimore.

Harris was elected as a candidate of the American Party to the Thirty-fourth, Thirty-fifth, and Thirty-sixth Congresses (March 4, 1855 – March 3, 1861). He declined to be a candidate for renomination in 1860 and resumed the practice of law. Harris also engaged in educational and religious work as well.

A trustee of Lafayette College from 1865 to 1872, he died in Baltimore in 1898 and is interred at the Westminster Presbyterian Burying Ground in Baltimore.

References

1817 births
1898 deaths
Politicians from Baltimore
Know-Nothing members of the United States House of Representatives from Maryland
Burials at Westminster Hall and Burying Ground
19th-century American politicians
Lafayette College trustees
Members of the United States House of Representatives from Maryland